Nasif Moisés Estéfano (18 November 1932 – 21 October 1973) was a racing driver from Argentina with Lebanese ancestry. He participated in two World Championship Formula One Grands Prix, debuting on 7 February 1960, but scored no championship points. He entered the 1962 Italian Grand Prix but failed to qualify. He was born in Concepción, Tucumán.

He died while driving in a local race in Aimogasta, La Rioja on 21 October 1973. His car suffered a mechanical failure on a fast curve, which caused the car to somersault a number of times. Estéfano was ejected from the car due to a fault with the safety belts, and was killed almost instantly due to head injuries.

Complete Formula One World Championship results
(key)

References

External links

 

1932 births
1973 deaths
Argentine people of Lebanese descent
Sport deaths in Argentina
Racing drivers who died while racing
Argentine racing drivers
Argentine Formula One drivers
Turismo Carretera drivers
De Tomaso Formula One drivers
World Sportscar Championship drivers

Sportspeople from Tucumán Province
12 Hours of Reims drivers